Kastor F.C. is a Greek football club, based in Kastoria, Kastoria.

History

Kastor F.C. comes from the merger of two teams of Kastoria city, Orestida and Tsardaikou witch held in 1985.
From then until 1993 the men's department took part in local leagues C, B and A class of Eps Kastoria.

At 1994 endangered a final dissolving, because it did not participate in any championship. 
Due to financial problems, the male part leaves the league.

In 1995 he takes over the Presidency Mr. Stavros Bachanteroglou, who with his colleagues attempt a new start for the club's recovery. The A.O. Kastor now works on a new basis and a new philosophy of the people around him capable of affording exponentially perspective on development and claiming high goals.

Honors

Domestic Titles and honors
 Kastoria Regional League: 3
 2003,2007,2009
 Kastoria Regional Cup: 4
 2004, 2009, 2010, 2011

External links
 http://aokastwr-news.blogspot.gr

Kastoria
Football clubs in Western Macedonia
Association football clubs established in 1985
1985 establishments in Greece